Howard Storm may refer to:

Howard Storm (author) (born 1946), American author, best known for the book My Descent Into Death
Howard Storm (director) (born 1939), American film, television director and actor